Rainbow Coalition may refer different or related political concepts or movements in various parts of the world. In countries with parliamentary systems, it can refer to any coalition government composed of a coalition of several ideologically unrelated political parties united by opposition to one or more dominant parties. In the US, the "rainbow" concept has mainly referred to a diversity ethnicities and other demographic categories within a political organization or movement.

North America

United States 
In the United States, the first rainbow coalition sought to bring together disadvantaged people from a broad spectrum of races and creeds, and voter mobilization was a primary goal in that effort. 
 1969: Fred Hampton's Rainbow Coalition was an alliance of various US political organizations in Chicago, primarily African Americans and former Latino Gangs- Jose Cha Cha Jimenez and the Young Lords. 
 1984: Jesse Jackson's Rainbow/PUSH Coalition called for Arab Americans, Native Americans, Asian Americans, youth, disabled veterans, small farmers, lesbians and gays to join with African Americans and Jewish Americans for political purpose around his presidential candidacy.
 1996: The Green-Rainbow Party is an affiliate of the Green Party of the United States in Massachusetts.

Canada 
 The informal name of a group of independent MPs in May/June 1990 before they started calling themselves Bloc Québécois.

Africa 
 National Rainbow Coalition, a former Kenyan political alliance

Europe 
 The 24th Government of Ireland, formed by Fine Gael, Labour and Democratic Left parties
 The 32nd Government of Ireland, formed by Fianna Fáil, Fine Gael and Green parties
 Lipponen I Cabinet and Lipponen II Cabinet (1995-2003), with parties from all parts of the left-right spectrum, were the original "rainbow coalitions" (sateenkaarihallitus) in Finland. Katainen Cabinet and its successor Stubb Cabinet were also characterized as rainbow coalitions.
 A group of political parties in Belgium, formed in 1999 under the premiership of Guy Verhofstadt (see Belgium#Government and politics)
 Rainbow (Netherlands), an alliance of Dutch left-wing political parties from 1989 to 1990.
 The Left - The Rainbow, an alliance of Italian left-wing political parties from 2007 to 2008.

Middle East 
 The Mizrahi Democratic Rainbow Coalition in Israel

See also 
Rainbow (disambiguation)
Rainbow (Greece), a political party in Greece
Coalition

References